Kamara's Tree is a 2013 Nigerian comedy drama film, directed by Desmond Elliot, starring Desmond Elliot, Lydia Forson, Ivie Okujaye, Tessy Abubakar, Bobby Obodo, Ginnefine Kanu, Morris K Sesay and Dabota Lawson. Set and shot in Freetown, Sierra Leone, the film tells the story of a family who gather for the wedding of one of their number, whom the rest of them have not seen for many years; each of the family members has to deal with the diverse behaviours of the others as a result.

Cast
Desmond Elliot as Tejan Kamara
Tessy Abubakar as Tenneth Kamara
Bobby Obodo  as Nouhou Kamara
Ginnefine Kanu as Selina Kamara
Morris K Sesay as Abdul Kamara
Lydia Forson as
Ivie Okujaye as Vero Kamara
Dabota Lawson as
Julius Spencer as

Release
A trailer for Kamara's Tree was released on 17 December 2012. The film premiered on VOD and television in February 2014, via IROKOtv and Africa Magic respectively.

See also
 List of Nigerian films of 2013

References

External links

2013 direct-to-video films
2013 films
English-language Nigerian films
Nigerian comedy-drama films
2013 comedy-drama films
Films set in Sierra Leone
2010s English-language films